Skeen Rocks is a two rocks lying south of Avian Island, off the south end of Adelaide Island. Named by the United Kingdom Antarctic Place-Names Committee (UK-APC) for Lieutenant Michael G.C. Skeen, Royal Navy, officer in charge of the helicopter flight, HMS charting this area in 1961–63.

Rock formations of Adelaide Island